Labé Region (Pular: 𞤁𞤭𞥅𞤱𞤢𞤤 𞤂𞤢𞤦𞤫) is located in north-central Guinea. It is bordered by the countries of Senegal and Mali and the Guinean regions of Faranah, Kindia, Mamou, and Boké.

Administrative divisions
Labé Region is divided into five prefectures; which are further sub-divided into 53 sub-prefectures:

 Koubia Prefecture (6 sub-prefectures)
 Labé Prefecture (13 sub-prefectures)
 Lélouma Prefecture (11 sub-prefectures)
 Mali Prefecture (13 sub-prefectures)
 Tougué Prefecture (10 sub-prefectures)

Geography
Labé Region is traversed by the northwesterly line of equal latitude and longitude.

References

 

Regions of Guinea